Khelifa Boukhalfa is a transfer station serving the Line 1 of the Algiers Metro.

Etymology
The Khelifa Boukhalfa station is located under the Boukhalfa Boulevard at the intersection of Mouloud-Belhouchet Boulevard, near the Didouche-Mourad Street and Rue Victor Hugo. It serves the neighborhoods located upstream of the place Maurice Audin-(Didouche-Mourad Mohamed V street and boulevard), the district of Cathédrale du Sacré-Cœur d'Alger and the neighborhood '' Messonnier '.

The station is named after an Algerian fighter Algerian War died in Algiers on 17 December 1957.

References

External links
 Algiers Metro
 Ligne 1 Algiers Metro on Structurae

Algiers Metro stations
Railway stations opened in 2011
Railway stations in Algeria opened in the 21st century